The men's 1 km time trial was one of the 10 men's events at the 2010 UCI Track Cycling World Championships, held in Ballerup, Denmark.

25 Cyclists from  17 countries participated in the contest. The Final was held on 26 March.

World record

Final

References

Results

Men's 1 km time trial
UCI Track Cycling World Championships – Men's 1 km time trial